Mamuju Regency is a regency of West Sulawesi province, Indonesia. The regency capital is at Karema, while Mamuju town is the capital of West Sulawesi. The population of the regency was 336,879 at the 2010 Census, but it was substantially reduced by the creation of the new Central Mamuju Regency which was cut out of it in 2012. The reduced Mamuju Regency covers an area of 4,954.57 km2 and had a population of 278,764 at the 2020 Census. The official estimate as at mid 2021 was 281,854.

Uranium sites
Mamuju Regency has high potential uranium sites with radioactivity of ~250 nsv per year as same as at Pocos de Caldas, Brazil. The highest potential uranium site at hill of Takandeang village about 40 kilometers from Mamuju City has radioactivity 2,000-3,000 nsw per hour.

Administration 
The regency is divided into eleven districts (kecamatan), tabulated below with their areas and their populations at the 2010 Census and 2020 Census, together with the official estimates for mid 2021. The table also includes the locations of the district administrative centres, the number of administrative villages (rural desa and urban kelurahan) in each district, and its post code.

Notes: (a) including offshore island of Pulau Karampuang to the north of the town. (b) the Balabalakang Islands are a small group lying between West Sulawesi and East Kalimantan, and closer to the latter. (c) including 4 offshore islands. (d) excluding the 2010 population of those regencies split off in 2012 to form the new Central Mamuju Regency.

References

External links 

  

Regencies of West Sulawesi